The sagaris is an ancient shafted weapon used by the horse-riding ancient Saka and Scythian peoples of the great Eurasian steppe. It was used also by Western and Central Asian peoples: the Medes, Persians, Parthians, Indo-Saka, Kushans, Mossynoeci, and others living within the milieu of Iranian peoples. According to Aristarchus of Samothrace, the legendary Amazons used the sagaris, as well. In The Histories, Herodotus attributes the sagaris to the Sacae Scythians in the army-list of Xerxes the Great.

The sagaris was a kind of battle-axe, or sometimes war hammer. Examples have been collected from Eurasian steppe archeological excavations, and are depicted on the Achaemenid cylinders and ancient Greek pottery and other surviving iconographic material. It is a long-shafted weapon with a metal head, with an either sharp (axe-like) or blunt (hammer-like) edge on one side and a sharp (straight or curving) 'ice-pick'-like point on the other. It may have been the sagaris that led medieval and Renaissance authors (such as Johannes Aventinus) to attribute the invention of the battle-axe weapon to the Amazons – as some Scythian women seen hunting and along warrior riders gave rise to the legend to the Amazons themselves – and to the modern association of the Amazons with the labrys.

A shorter form, as depicted in the hand of Spalirises on his coins, was labelled klevets by Russian archaeologist and ancient military historian V.P. Nikonorov.

References

Axes
Hammers
Ancient weapons